Three ships of the Imperial German Navy and one of the Austro-Hungarian Navy have been named SMS Möwe:

 , a German gunboat launched in 1879
 , a German survey vessel launched in 1906
 , an Austro-Hungarian  launched in 1907
 , a German commerce raider during World War I, launched as Pungo in 1914

German Navy ship names